SeaDream II is a small cruise ship operated by SeaDream Yacht Club.  In service since 1985, she was formerly named Sea Goddess II and operated by Cunard. This was followed by a transfer to Seabourn in 2000 where she became Seabourn Goddess II.  In 2001 the ship was sold to Sea Dream Yacht Club.  She is a sister ship to SeaDream I.

References

External links

SeaDream Yacht Club – official site
 - Sea Goddess II history on Chris Frame's Cunard Page

1984 ships
Cruise ships
Ships built in Helsinki
Ships of SeaDream Yacht Club
Wärtsilä